Nashwa may refer to:

People 
 Nashwa Mustafa, Egyptian actress
 Nashwa Eassa, Sudanese particle physicist
 Nashwa Al-Ruwaini, Egyptian media personality

Places 
 Al Nashwa, Iraq, a village in Basrah Governorate
 Al-Nashwa, a district of Al-Hasakah, Syria

Other 
 Nashwa (horse), Thoroughbred racehorse foaled in 2019

See also 
 Nashwan (disambiguation), for the masculine version of this given name

Arabic given names